Simon was a Pharisee mentioned in the Gospel of Luke (Luke 7:36-50) as the host of a meal, who invited Jesus to eat in his house but failed to show him the usual marks of hospitality offered to visitors - a greeting kiss (v. 45), water to wash his feet (v. 44), or oil for his head (v. 46).

During the meal, a tearful woman identified as a sinner anointed Jesus' feet. He contrasted her faith and care with Simon's failure to show common decency, and accused him of being forgiven little and (in consequence) loving little (v. 47).

The preceding sections of Luke's gospel took place in Capernaum and in Nain, both in Galilee, suggesting Simon also lived in Galilee.

Simon the Pharisee is not mentioned in the other canonical gospels, but there are similarities between this Simon and Simon the leper mentioned in Matthew's Gospel (Matt 26:6-13) and Mark's Gospel (Mk 14:3-9), not least the same name occurring. Because of these similarities, efforts have been made to reconcile the events and characters, but some scholars have pointed out differences between the two events. An alternative explanation for the similarities is that the Luke 7 anointing and the anointing at Bethany (Matthew 26:6, Mark 14:3, John 12:1) happened with some of the same participants, but several years apart.

See also
 Luke 7

References

Gospel of Luke
People in the canonical gospels
1st-century Jews
Pharisees